Gowri Krishnan is an Indian television actress. She is known for her leading roles of Krishnendu in Kana Kanmani and Pournami in Pournami Thinkal.

Personal life 
She was engaged to serial director Manoj on 11 February 2022.

Filmography

Television

Films

References

Living people
Malayali people
Actresses from Kerala
Indian soap opera actresses
21st-century Indian actresses
Actresses in Malayalam television
Actresses in Malayalam cinema
Year of birth missing (living people)